1559 Kustaanheimo, provisional designation , is a stony asteroid from the inner regions of the asteroid belt, approximately 11 kilometers in diameter. It was discovered on 20 January 1942, by Finnish astronomer Liisi Oterma at the Iso-Heikkilä Observatory near Turku in southwest Finland. The asteroid was named after Finnish astronomer Paul Kustaanheimo (1924–1997).

Orbit and classification 

Kustaanheimo is an asteroid from the main belt's background population that does not belong to any known asteroid family. It orbits the Sun in the inner main-belt at a distance of 2.1–2.7 AU once every 3 years and 8 months (1,350 days). Its orbit has an eccentricity of 0.13 and an inclination of 3° with respect to the ecliptic.

Physical characteristics 

Kustaanheimo is an assumed stony S-type asteroid.

Rotation period 

In February 2005, a rotational lightcurve of Kustaanheimo was obtained from photometric observations by American astronomer John Menke at his Menke Observatory in Barnesville, Maryland. Lightcurve analysis gave a rotation period of 4.286 hours with a brightness variation of 0.25 magnitude. One month later, another well-defined lightcurve by French amateur astronomer Laurent Bernasconi gave a period of 4.302 hours and an amplitude of 0.23 magnitude. In April 2016, Petr Pravec obtained an intermediary period of 4.3 hours with a brightness variation of 0.29 at the Ondřejov Observatory.

Spin axis 

In 2013, an international study modeled a lightcurve with a similar period of 4.30435 hours and found two spin axis of (275.0°, 29.0°) and (94.0°, 33.0°) in ecliptic coordinates (λ, β) .

Diameter and albedo 

According to the surveys carried out by the Japanese Akari satellite and the NEOWISE mission of NASA's Wide-field Infrared Survey Explorer, Kustaanheimo measures between 9.07 and 12.70 kilometers in diameter and its surface has an albedo between 0.193 and 0.373.

The Collaborative Asteroid Lightcurve Link assumes a standard albedo for stony asteroids of 0.20 and calculates a diameter of 12.39 kilometers based on an absolute magnitude of 11.9.

Naming 

This minor planet was named after Paul Kustaanheimo (1924–1997), a Finnish astronomer at the Helsinki University Observatory who made important contributions to celestial mechanics and the theory of relativity and best known for his K-S transformation. In 1969, he was appointed professor of astronomy at the University of Helsinki after the retirement of Gustaf Järnefelt (also see 1558 Järnefelt).

The official  was published by the Minor Planet Center on 20 February 1976.

Notes

References

External links 
 Asteroid Lightcurve Database (LCDB), query form (info )
 Dictionary of Minor Planet Names, Google books
 Asteroids and comets rotation curves, CdR – Observatoire de Genève, Raoul Behrend
 Discovery Circumstances: Numbered Minor Planets (1)-(5000) – Minor Planet Center
 
 

001559
Discoveries by Liisi Oterma
Named minor planets
19420120